Fredericksburg City Public Schools is a school division serving students that live in Fredericksburg, Virginia

Administration

Superintendent 
The current Superintendent of Fredericksburg City Public Schools is Dr. Marceline Catlett. Before being appointed as superintendent, Dr. Catlett served as the Director of Curriculum and Instruction, Assistant Superintendent for Instruction and Personnel, and Deputy Superintendent of Fredericksburg City Public Schools in before being appointed superintendent in 2020.

School Board Members 

 Kathleen Pomeroy (Chair)
 Jarvis Bailey
 Jennifer Boyd
 Jannan Holmes
 Malvina Kay
 Matt Rowe

Schools 
Fredericksburg City Public Schools currently has five schools; an early childhood learning center, two elementary schools, a middle school, and a high school.

Elementary Schools and Early Childhood Learning Centers 

 Walker-Grant Early Childhood Learning Center
 Hugh Mercer Elementary School
 Lafayette Elementary School
 A third elementary school is scheduled to open in Fall 2024.

Middle school 

 Walker-Grant Middle School
 A new middle school to replace the current Walker-Grant Middle School is scheduled to open in Fall 2024.

High school 

 James Monroe High School

References 

School divisions in Virginia
Education in Fredericksburg, Virginia
Educational institutions in the United States with year of establishment missing